Larry Babb (born 6 May 1983) is a Barbadian cricketer. He played in two Twenty20 matches for the Barbados cricket team in 2010.

See also
 List of Barbadian representative cricketers

References

External links
 

1983 births
Living people
Barbadian cricketers
Barbados cricketers
People from Saint Lucy, Barbados